Mahamana Express is a Model Rake based superfast express series trains operated by Indian Railways in India.

This train is named after and in honor to Pt. Shri Madan Mohan Malaviya (Mahamana), a freedom fighter & an educationist who established Banaras Hindu University, Varanasi.

Model Rake
The train includes Model Rakes modified by Indian Railways under Make In India scheme. 
The coaches contain some modern facilities like:
 Toilet: Bigger mirror, platform wash basin, controlled discharged water tap, odour control system, exhaust fans, LED lights, dustbin inside the toilet, All the toilets are fitted with bio toilets, in line with Indian Railways' vision to make tracks defecation free.
 Ladder: Ergonomically designed Ladders for climbing up to upper berths provided in all coaches.
 Side berths: Snack tables provided for side berth passengers also with innovative design side lower berth arrangement.
 Windows: Windows with powered venetian blinds and roller blind instead of conventional curtains.
 Lighting: LED based berth indicators for reserved coaches, and all other illumination.
 Charging Points: Charging points made available for every berth.
 Safety: Fire extinguishers in all coaches.
 Pantry Car: Modular pantry with electric chimneys.

Trains
Madhya Pradesh state has more than 3 Mahamana Express trains. The more number of trains any state can have.
 Bhopal - Khajuraho Mahamana Express
 Indore - Bikaner Mahamana Express
 Ekta Nagar - Rewa Mahamana Express
 Ekta Nagar - Varanasi Mahamana Express
 Varanasi - New Delhi Mahamana Express
 Veraval - Indore Mahamana Express

References

See also

Memorials to Madan Mohan Malaviya